Marcel Holzmann (born 3 September 1990) is an Austrian professional footballer who plays as a defender for German club Phönix Lübeck.  In his career, Holzmann also played for teams such as Red Bull Salzburg Juniors, FC Lustenau, St. Pölten or FC Botoșani, among others.

Honours
SKN St. Pölten
 Erste Liga: 2015–16

References

External links

1990 births
Living people
Austrian footballers
Association football defenders
3. Liga players
FC Red Bull Salzburg players
FC Bayern Munich II players
SKN St. Pölten players
Liga I players
FC Botoșani players
LPS HD Clinceni players
1. FC Phönix Lübeck players
Austrian expatriate footballers
Austrian expatriate sportspeople in Romania
Expatriate footballers in Romania
Austrian expatriate sportspeople in Germany
Expatriate footballers in Germany